Swinton South (ward) is an electoral ward of Salford, England.  It is represented in Westminster by Rebecca Long-Bailey MP for Salford and Eccles. A profile of the ward conducted by Salford City Council in 2014 recorded a population of 11,458.

The ward is to be abolished following a review by the Local Government Boundary Commission for England

Councillors 
The ward is represented by three councillors: Stuart Dickman (Lab), Neil Watkin (Ind), and Heather Fletcher (Lab)

 indicates seat up for re-election.
 indicates seat won in by-election.
 indicates councillor defected.
 NB: Neil Watkin is an author who also uses the name Neil Blower.

Elections in 2010s

May 2018

May 2016

May 2015

May 2014

By-election 7 January 2014

May 2012

May 2011

May 2010

Elections in 2000s

References 

Salford City Council Wards